WRPK-LP is a Variety formatted broadcast radio station. The station is licensed to Kilmarnock, Virginia and serving Kilmarnock, Irvington, and White Stone in Virginia. WRPK-LP is owned and operated by Watershed Radio Project, Incorporated.

References

External links
 

2017 establishments in Virginia
Variety radio stations in the United States
Radio stations established in 2017
RPK-LP
RPK-LP